Titiotus is a genus of American false wolf spiders that was first described by Eugène Louis Simon in 1897.

Spiders in this genus are often misidentified as the brown recluse spider of the genus Loxosceles due to similarities of coloration, body proportions, leg length, and even leg positioning prior to movement. Species within the Titiotus genus are "all found within the California (United States), often in areas of dense human population." "They are most common from the northernmost portions of the state to the southern portions just north of the mountains near Los Angeles Basin. They are often found in redwood forests and present in cabins in the woods."

Species

 it contains sixteen species, found in the United States:
Titiotus californicus Simon, 1897 (type) – USA
Titiotus costa Platnick & Ubick, 2008 – USA
Titiotus flavescens (Chamberlin & Ivie, 1941) – USA
Titiotus fresno Platnick & Ubick, 2008 – USA
Titiotus gertschi Platnick & Ubick, 2008 – USA
Titiotus hansii (Schenkel, 1950) – USA
Titiotus heberti Platnick & Ubick, 2008 – USA
Titiotus humboldt Platnick & Ubick, 2008 – USA
Titiotus icenoglei Platnick & Ubick, 2008 – USA
Titiotus madera Platnick & Ubick, 2008 – USA
Titiotus marin Platnick & Ubick, 2008 – USA
Titiotus roadsend Platnick & Ubick, 2008 – USA
Titiotus shantzi Platnick & Ubick, 2008 – USA
Titiotus shasta Platnick & Ubick, 2008 – USA
Titiotus tahoe Platnick & Ubick, 2008 – USA
Titiotus tulare Platnick & Ubick, 2008 – USA

See also
 List of Zoropsidae species

References

Araneomorphae genera
Spiders of the United States
Zoropsidae